The Coexist Foundation (stylized Coexist) is a charitable organization based in Washington, D.C. and London, United Kingdom, which aims to advance social cohesion through education and innovation.

It was founded in London in 2006 by Mohammed Abdul Latif Jameel, to promote better understanding among Jews, Christians, and Muslims through education, dialogue, and research.

A 2002 Gallup Poll of the Islamic world revealed rising tensions between religious and ethnic groups around the world, prompting the formation of the organization. Coexist had a not-for-profit relationship with The Gallup Organization. Since then, Coexist has broadened the scope of its work to include issues of cultural variety as well as relations between the Abrahamic religions: Judaism, Christianity, and Islam.

Coexist is responsible for several projects that are meant to advance the objectives of the organization. An example is its radio show "Pause for Thought," which was created in collaboration with the BBC. The program includes guests from various religious backgrounds sharing their insights on a common subject. 

One of the Foundation's projects was "Understanding Islam" a first series of internet learning resources designed to give an accessible but thorough introduction to Judaism, Christianity and Islam. Coexist joined with online education specialists Microbooks and a team of scholars to develop the series.

The organization's logo is the Coexist sign, originally created in 2000 by Polish graphic designer   for a contest hosted by The Museum on the Seam for Dialogue, Understanding and Coexistence in Jerusalem.

References

Foundations based in England
Religious charities